Paul Leon Hartman (13 July 1913, Reno, Nevada – 20 May 2005, Ithaca, New York) was an American experimental physicist, known for making pioneering measurements of synchrotron radiation.

Biography
Hartman graduated in 1934 from the University of Nevada with a B.S. in electrical engineering and in 1938 from Cornell University with a Ph.D. in physics. His thesis advisor was Lloyd P. Smith (1904–1988). Hartman was a physics instructor at Cornell for the academic year 1938–1939. From 1939 to 1946 he worked at Bell Telephone Laboratories. During WW II he  worked with James Brown Fisk and Homer D. Hagstrum in the development of centimeter-wave generators for airborne radar. Hartman was a faculty member in the physics department of Cornell University from 1946 to 1983, when he retired as professor emeritus. He held a joint appointment in Cornell's department of physics engineering (which was renamed the "School of Applied and Engineering Physics"). From 1971 to 1973 he was the associate director of Cornell's School of Applied and Engineering Physics.

He was elected a Fellow of the American Physical Society in 1972. He helped to establish the Cornell High-Energy Synchrotron Source (CHESS).

Upon his death he was survived by his widow, three daughters, two grandchildren, and four great-grandchildren.

Selected publications

Articles

Books
 ; online pdf

References

1913 births
2005 deaths
20th-century American physicists
University of Nevada alumni
Cornell University alumni
Cornell University faculty
Fellows of the American Physical Society
Scientists at Bell Labs